Dave Babcock is a Canadian saxophonist, singer, bandleader and producer.

He was a guest on Kenny "Blues Boss" Wayne's Jumpin' & Boppin'  album. He played at a memorial event for Dave Semenko in 2017.

References

Year of birth missing (living people)
Living people
Musicians from Vancouver
Canadian jazz saxophonists
Male saxophonists
Smooth jazz saxophonists
Canadian male singers
Canadian jazz singers
MacEwan University alumni
21st-century saxophonists
21st-century Canadian male musicians
Canadian male jazz musicians